Campbell River Transit System provides public transportation to the city of Campbell River, on the east coast of Vancouver Island, British Columbia. Service also extends to Oyster Bay-Buttle Lake, under an agreement with the Strathcona Regional District. Most transit buses are low floor wheelchair accessible and come equipped with bike racks. Transportation for people whose disability prevents them from using conventional bus service is provided by HandyDART service for eligible registered users.

See also

 Public transport in Canada

References

External links
Campbell River Transit System (BC Transit)

Campbell River, British Columbia
Transit agencies in British Columbia